Pyotr Kozhevnikov (born 1927) was a Soviet athlete. He competed in the men's decathlon at the 1952 Summer Olympics.

References

External links
 

1927 births
Possibly living people
Athletes (track and field) at the 1952 Summer Olympics
Soviet decathletes
Olympic athletes of the Soviet Union
Place of birth missing